Kevin Cumbane (born 19 July 1999), commonly known as Kamo-Kamo, is a Mozambican footballer who plays as a forward for Vitória de Setúbal U23 and the Mozambique national football team.

Career

International
Kamo-Kamo made his senior international debut on 27 May 2018, coming on as a halftime substitute for Isac Carvalho in a 2-1 defeat to Madagascar at the 2018 COSAFA Cup.

Career statistics

International

References

External links
Kamo-Kamo at Sky Sports

1999 births
Living people
Mozambican footballers
Mozambique international footballers
Mozambican expatriate footballers
Mozambican expatriate sportspeople in Portugal
Expatriate footballers in Portugal
Association football forwards
Sportspeople from Maputo
Clube Ferroviário de Maputo footballers
Moçambola players